Joseph Cheng, (born 19 June 1982) is a Taiwanese model, actor and singer. Although he started his career as a model, Cheng is well known for his role as Jiang Zhishu in Taiwanese drama serial version of Japanese manga Itazura Na Kiss, It Started with a Kiss. Cheng has gained much recognition as an actor in most parts of Asia, particularly Taiwan, China, Hong Kong, Singapore, Philippines and Japan. Cheng released his debut EP, Sing a Song, in October 2009. The title of the EP as well as its title track is a play on the third word in his name, Chang (暢) as a homophone of the word "Sing" (唱) in Chinese.

Early life
Joe Cheng, who was previously (prior to 2005) known as Bryan Cheng, grew up in Beitun District, Taichung, Taiwan. Since his parents' divorce when he was in primary school, he has lived with his father. He also has an elder sister, who lives with their mother.

Acting career 
Cheng began his career in the entertainment industry with Catwalk Modelling Agency. He reportedly achieved success as a model within one year of signing. Cheng is based in Taiwan and also counts China, Hong Kong and Japan as his main target markets.

As a model, Cheng was featured in several music videos, including one of Heavenly King Jacky Cheung's. In 2003, he took on the role of the second male lead in The Rose, a Taiwanese drama serial which also starred Taiwanese girl band S.H.E and renowned actress Cecilia Yip. It was this role that kick-started his acting career. Following his rising popularity and the success of his first acting role, Cheng was asked to make a guest appearance as Lucifer in Taiwanese boyband Energy’s first-ever idol drama, Dance with Michael, in the same year. Cheng starred as the main lead in two dramas, Nine-ball and Magic Ring in 2004. Although these two serials achieved lukewarm success, Cheng took the role of the main lead in It Started with a Kiss in the following year. This serial achieved high ratings in Taiwan and was popular with audiences throughout Asia. Cheng's popularity rose tremendously as a result. It Started with a Kiss was also Cheng's first collaboration with actress Ariel Lin. The two, who are often touted as one of Taiwan's most compatible on-screen couples, paired up again in the 2007 sequel to It Started with a Kiss, They Kiss Again; as well as Love or Bread (2008) which is unrelated to the Kiss series. Cheng has starred in numerous drama serials produced in Taiwan,China and Japan, but remains most well known for his roles in The Rose and the Kiss series.

As a model, Cheng has modelled for several big-name brands including Puma AG (2003–2005) and adidas (2006–present). He has starred in numerous runway shows for brands such as Marc Jacob's (2003), Timberland, Levi's and Christian Dior (2007) He often also appears at flagship store openings including Hugo Boss (2009). Cheng also endorses several food, jewellery and clothing brands; the most recent being Chinese green tea brand Kang Shifu (for which Cheng starred and recorded a song with Mike He and Taiwanese actress Joe Chen) as well as casual wear brand N+a (with Taiwanese singer-actress Cyndi Wang). He also worked as a spokesperson for Shiatzy Chen.

Excluding drama serial memorabilia, Cheng has released three pictorial books in addition to four calendars and one mini pictorial in conjunction with the release of his EP in 2009. He has also authored two books and co-authored another on his hometown Taichung. He was also featured in a 2006 book on Catwalk Modelling Agency. Cheng has won multiple awards as a model and as a performing artiste. The most notable include one at the Asia Model Festival Awards 2009, in which he won the Asia Special Award. Cheng, together with Sylvia Chang and Mike He, was appointed as an ambassador for World Vision in December 2009.

Music career
2009 was a quiet year for the television star, who spent the year busy with his theatre debut, Design for Living, starring opposite stage veterans Sylvia Chang and David Wang, under the directorship of Hong Kong stage director Edward Lam. The troupe made several sell-out shows in Hong Kong, China, Taiwan and Singapore. Cheng said that it has always been one of his goals to star in a stage play and was very honoured to have been able to star in the same production as Sylvia Chang. In the same year he also released his first EP, Sing a Song. Cheng is known by his friends in the industry as one who loves to sing. Album sales were fair and the EP topped certain charts in Taiwan but Cheng failed to convince music critics of the industry. Much to the dismay of his fans, Cheng did not star in any drama series in 2009.

In addition to his entertainment career, Cheng is completing his part-time university studies in tourism management at Hsing Wu College. As all males in Taiwan have to enlist for National Service, Cheng is due to enlist as soon as he completes his education. In 2010 Cheng represented Taiwan and performed at the 7th Asia Song Festival, organised by Korea Foundation for International Culture Exchange, at the Seoul Olympic Stadium.

Personal life
Joe Cheng is now discharged from military service in the second regiment of the Taiwan Coast Guard.

Filmography

Films 
 What on Earth Have I Done Wrong?! (2007)
 Ripples of Desire (2012)
 Time Archive (2012)
 The Queens (2015)
 The Beloved (2015)

Television series

Variety Shows

Awards and nominations

Music videos 
 2003 – 葉子" (Leaf) – The Rose OST by A-Sun
Bu Chao Bu Nao (不吵不鬧)- Landy 溫嵐
Ji Ta Shou (吉他手)- 陳綺貞
Gift – Jacky Cheung
Ye Zi/Leaf （叶子） – A Sun
E Zuo Ju （恶作剧）(It Started with a Kiss OST) – Wang Lan Yin
Bu Si Xin/Unwilling to Give Up （不死心） – Joe Cheng
Chang Yi Shou Ge/Sing a Song （唱一首歌）- Joe Cheng

Discography

Books
Yuan Wei Chang Kuai《元味暢快》(2005)
Always Smile 《籃球偶像事件簿》(2003)
My Color My Style 《我型我色——鄭元暢配色寶典》(2003)

References

External links

  Joe Cheng's site
  Joe Cheng@Avex Taiwan
  Profile at Catwalk Modeling Agency

1982 births
Living people
Male actors from Taichung
Taiwanese Mandopop singers
Taiwanese male stage actors
Taiwanese male television actors
Taiwanese idols
21st-century Taiwanese male singers
Musicians from Taichung
Participants in Chinese reality television series
Reality show winners
The Amazing Race contestants
Korean-language singers of Taiwan